Pong Nam Ron is a tambon (subdistrict) of Fang District, in Chiang Mai Province, Thailand. In 2009 it had a population of 5687 people. The tambon contains seven villages.

References

External links
 TAO Pong Nam Ron

Tambon of Chiang Mai province
Populated places in Chiang Mai province